was the soonest virtual impactor of an asteroid larger than 50 meters in diameter with a better than 1:1-million chance of impacting Earth. On 11 March 2023 it had a 1-in-500,000 chance of impact. It is estimated to be 54-meters in diameter and has a short observation arc of 3-days. On 11 March 2023 it was nominally expected to be  from Earth but had an uncertainty region billions of kilometers long. Between 2005 and 2023 it could orbit the Sun 6.2 to 7.8 times.

It was first observed on 13 March 2005 when the asteroid was estimated to be  from Earth and had a solar elongation of 137 degrees.

The 11 March 2018 virtual impactor did not occur. The line of variation (LOV) for 2018 was billions of kilometers long and wrapped around the asteroid's orbit so that the asteroid could have been numerous different distances from the Earth. The 2023 line of variation (LOV) was also billions of kilometers long and stretched around the asteroid's known orbit.

See also

References

External links 
 
 
 

Lost minor planets

Minor planet object articles (unnumbered)

Potential impact events caused by near-Earth objects
20050313